Marangoni is an Italian surname. Notable people with the surname include:

Alan Marangoni (born 1984), Italian cyclist
Alessandro Marangoni (born 1979), Italian classical pianist
Carlo Marangoni (1840–1925), Italian physicist
Marangoni effect
Marangoni number
Clara Marangoni (1915–2018), Italian gymnast
Claudio Marangoni (born 1954), Argentine footballer
Giovanni Marangoni
Rodrigo Marangoni (born 1978), Argentine footballer

Italian-language surnames